MH SH 194 or Maharashtra State Highway 194 runs in Buldhana, Akola and Amravati Districts.

It starts from Madhya Pradesh and has a route as Dolarkheda - Ichhapur. It enters Buldhana District and passes through Karanwadi - Khandvi - Asalgaon - Wadi Kh - Jalgaon Jamod on MH SH 195 - Jamod - Karmoda - Ladnapur - Tunki on MH SH 173 and Sonala. It crosses the Vaan River and  enters into Akola District at Warkhed, then passes through as - Saundala - Hiwarkhed - Adgaon - Akot along the foothills of Satpuda hills,  moves towards the plains in Amravati District as  Sawara -Wadner Gangai-Daryapur - Kholapur - Dhabhori - Valgaon - Revsa and finally joins Hajira - Kolkata National Highway 6 at Nandgaon.

References

See also
 List of State Highways in Maharashtra

State Highways in Maharashtra